José Carlos da Silva José (born 22 September 1941), known as José Carlos, is a Portuguese former footballer who played mostly as a central defender.

Club career
Born in Vila Franca de Xira, Lisbon District, José Carlos joined Sporting CP in 1962 from G.D. Fabril in Barreiro. Over 12 seasons, all spent in the Primeira Liga (14 counting those with his previous team), he appeared in more than 300 official matches, winning three leagues and three cups and adding the 1964 edition of the UEFA Cup Winners' Cup.

José Carlos retired in 1975 at the age of 34, after a brief spell in the second division with S.C. Braga.

International career
José Carlos played 36 times for Portugal, three as a CUF player and 33 whilst at the service of Sporting. His debut came on 19 March 1961 against Luxembourg for the 1962 FIFA World Cup qualifiers (6–0 home win), and his last appearance came nearly ten years later, against Denmark for the UEFA Euro 1972 qualifying stages (5–0 victory).

José Carlos represented the country at the 1966 World Cup in England. He appeared twice in the tournament, against England in the semi-finals and the Soviet Union in the third-place match, the latter ending in a 2–1 triumph.

Honours
Sporting CP
Primeira Liga: 1965–66, 1969–70, 1973–74
Taça de Portugal: 1962–63, 1970–71, 1973–74
UEFA Cup Winners' Cup: 1963–64

Portugal
FIFA World Cup third place: 1966

References

External links

1941 births
Living people
People from Vila Franca de Xira
Portuguese footballers
Association football defenders
Primeira Liga players
G.D. Fabril players
Sporting CP footballers
S.C. Braga players
Portugal youth international footballers
Portugal under-21 international footballers
Portugal international footballers
1966 FIFA World Cup players
Portuguese football managers
Primeira Liga managers
Liga Portugal 2 managers
S.C. Braga managers
Boavista F.C. managers
Varzim S.C. managers
G.D. Chaves managers
Gil Vicente F.C. managers
U.S.C. Paredes managers
F.C. Penafiel managers
S.C. Dragões Sandinenses managers
Sportspeople from Lisbon District